Siegmar Klotz  (born 28 October 1987) is an Italian freestyle skier. He competed in the 2017 FIS Freestyle World Ski Championships, and in the 2018 Winter Olympics.

References

External links

1987 births
Living people
Italian male alpine skiers
Italian male freestyle skiers
Olympic freestyle skiers of Italy 
Freestyle skiers at the 2018 Winter Olympics
Sportspeople from Merano
Germanophone Italian people
21st-century Italian people